Masihuddin Shaker is a Bangladeshi film director and writer. In 1979, he won the Bangladesh National Film Award for Best Director for the film Surja Dighal Bari.

Background
Shaker studied architecture at Bangladesh University of Engineering and Technology.

Selected films
 Surja Dighal Bari - 1979

Awards and nominations
National Film Awards

References

External links
 
 

Living people
Bangladesh University of Engineering and Technology alumni
Bangladeshi film directors
Best Director National Film Award (Bangladesh) winners
Place of birth missing (living people)
Year of birth missing (living people)